Seven Cities of Gold refers to seven cities in Spanish mythology.

It may also refer to:
 Seven Cities of Gold (film), a 1955 historical adventure film starring Richard Egan
 The Seven Cities of Gold (video game), a 1984 adventure game
 Seven Cities of Gold (book), a 2010 book by David Moles
 "Seven Cities of Gold", a track on the 2012 Rush album Clockwork Angels

See also
 City of Gold (disambiguation)
 Seven Cities (disambiguation)